Mahlangu is a surname.

Geographical distribution
As of 2014, 95.6% of all known bearers of the surname Mahlangu were residents of South Africa (frequency 1:254) and 3.9% of Zimbabwe (1:1,760). 

In South Africa, the frequency of the surname was higher than national average (1:254) in the following provinces:
 1. Mpumalanga (1:33)
 2. Gauteng (1:254)

In Zimbabwe, the frequency of the surname was higher than national average (1:1,760) in the following provinces:
 1. Bulawayo (1:376)
 2. Matabeleland South (1:420)
 3. Matabeleland North (1:422)

People
Notable people with the surname include:

Bongani Mahlangu (born 1979), boxer from South Africa
Chris Mahlangu, killer of Eugène Terre'Blanche (1941–2010), South African politician and founder and leader of the Afrikaner Weerstandsbeweging (AWB)
Duncan Mahlangu (born 1983), South African taekwondo practitioner who competed in the men's featherweight category
Esther Mahlangu (born 1935), South African Ndebele artist
Jabu Mahlangu (formerly Jabu Jeremiah Pule) (born 1980), retired South African football (soccer) midfielder
July Mahlangu (born 1980), South African football (soccer) midfielder for Thanda Royal Zulu
M. J. Mahlangu, South African politician
Magodonga Mahlangu, women's rights campaigner from Zimbabwe who in 2009 was awarded the Robert F Kennedy Human Rights Award by U.S. President Barack Obama
May Mahlangu (born 1989), South African footballer
Moses Mahlangu (born 1925), long-time supporter of the teachings of The Church of Jesus Christ of Latter-day Saints (LDS Church) in South Africa
Sibusiso Mahlangu (born 1982), South African football (soccer) player
Solomon Mahlangu (1956–1979), South African operative of the African National Congress (ANC) militant wing, Umkhonto weSizwe (MK), hanged for murder in 1979
Qedani Mahlangu, (born 1968) the former Gauteng MEC for Health and Social Development
Thamsanqa Mahlangu (died 2015), former MDC politician and Zimbabwe Deputy Minister of Youth Development, Indigenisation and Empowerment
Gwen Mahlangu-Nkabinde (born 1955), South African politician who was Speaker of the National Assembly of South Africa from 2008 to 2009

See also
Mahlangu Tigers FC, South African football (soccer) club, with the full official name Mahlangu Tigers
Malan (disambiguation)
Malang
Mangu (disambiguation)

References

Bantu-language surnames